Bryan Buffington (born April 1, 1980) is an American actor.  He is best known for his role as Bill Lewis III on Guiding Light.

Filmography

Awards and nominations
Daytime Emmy Awards

Young Artist Awards

References

External links
 

1980 births
Living people
American male soap opera actors
Male actors from New Jersey